Political satire is satire that specializes in gaining entertainment from politics; it has also been used with subversive intent where political speech and dissent are forbidden by a regime, as a method of advancing political arguments where such arguments are expressly forbidden.

Political satire is usually distinguished from political protest or political dissent, as it does not necessarily carry an agenda nor seek to influence the political process. While occasionally it may, it more commonly aims simply to provide entertainment. By its very nature, it rarely offers a constructive view in itself; when it is used as part of protest or dissent, it tends to simply establish the error of matters rather than provide solutions.

Origins and genres

Satire can be traced back throughout history; wherever organized government, or social categories, has existed, so has satire.

The oldest example that has survived till today is Aristophanes. In his time satire targeted top politicians, like Cleon, and religion, at the time headed by Zeus. "Satire and derision progressively attacked even the fundamental and most sacred facts of faith," leading to an increased doubt towards religion by the general population. The Roman period, for example, gives us the satirical poems and epigrams of Martial. Cynic philosophers often engaged in political satire.

Due to lack of political freedom of speech in many ancient civilizations, covert satire is more usual than overt satire in ancient literatures of political liberalism. Historically, the public opinion in the Athenian democracy was remarkably influenced by the political satire performed by the comic poets at the theatres. Watching or reading satire has since ancient time been considered one of the best ways to understand a culture and a society.

During the 20th and 21st Centuries satire is found in an increasing number of media (in cartoons as political cartoons with heavy caricature and exaggeration, and in political magazines) and the parallel exposure of political scandals to performances (including television shows). Examples include musicians such as Tom Lehrer incorporating lyrics which targeted the army and the church, live performance groups like the Capitol Steps and the Montana Logging and Ballet Co., and public television and live performer Mark Russell who made satirist comments to both democrats and republicans alike. Additional subgenres include such literary classics as Gulliver's Travels and Animal Farm, and more recently, internet Ezine and website sources such as The Onion.

Well-known examples of political satire  
An early and well-known piece of political satire is a poem by Dante Alighieri called Divine Comedy (c. 1308–1320). In this piece, Dante suggests that politicians of that time in Florence should travel to hell. Another well-known form of political satire through theater is William Shakespeare's play Richard II, which criticized politics and authority figures of the time.

19th and 20th centuries

France 
One example is Maurice Joly's 1864 pamphlet entitled The Dialogue in Hell Between Machiavelli and Montesquieu (Dialogue aux enfers entre Machiavel et Montesquieu), which attacks the political ambitions of Napoleon III. It was first published in Brussels in 1864. The piece used the literary device of a dialogue between two diabolical plotters in Hell, the historical characters of Machiavelli and Montesquieu, to cover up a direct, and illegal, attack on Napoleon's rule. The noble baron Montesquieu made the case for liberalism; the Florentine political writer Machiavelli presented the case for cynical despotism. In this manner, Joly communicated the secret ways in which liberalism might spawn a despot like Napoleon III.

The literacy rate in France was roughly 30 percent in the 19th century making it virtually impossible for people of lower classes to engage in political satire. However, visual arts could be interpreted by anyone, and a man named Charles Philipon took advantage creating two weekly magazines, La Caricature and Le Charivari – the cheaper of the two. Philipon used his papers, which had become more and more popular across France, as a threat to the King, Louis-Philippe, as the papers used satire and humor to criticize the government and King. Several attempts to suppress the two magazines were made by the monarchy which would only make the articles more critical. Philipon was eventually taken to court and sentenced to 13 months in prison following several more arrests.

The drawings that originally sent Philipon to court were drawings that turned the King into a pear over the course of the drawings. The people of France began to recognize that King Louis-Philippe really did look like a pear and could not separate the two. People began to sarcastically state that pears should be banned in the country as cutting one would be a threat towards the King, Louis-Philippe.

Germany

According to Santayana,  German philosopher Friedrich Nietzsche was actually "a keen satirist".
"Nietzsche's satire" was aimed at Lutheranism.

Kladderadatsch and Simplicissimus were two sources of political satire in Germany during the 18-19 century, both of which show how satire can be used to see cultural history in societies. Popularity in press and satirical jokes flourished in the 19th century as thousands of new magazines emerged in Germany. Magazines and news papers began to exceed the consumption of books and became one of the most popular forms of media in Germany at the time.

United Kingdom
The UK has a long tradition of political satire, dating from the early years of English literature. In some readings, a number of William Shakespeare's plays can be seen – or at least performed – as satire, including Richard III and The Merchant of Venice. Later examples such as Jonathan Swift's A Modest Proposal are more outright in their satirical nature.

Through the 18th and 19th centuries editorial cartoons developed as graphic form of satire, with dedicated satirical magazines of the like of Punch appearing in the first half of the 19th century.

In recent decades, political satire in the United Kingdom includes pamphlets and newspaper articles, such as Private Eye, topical television panel shows such as Have I Got News for You and Mock the Week, and television series such as Ballot Monkeys, The Mash Report and Spitting Image.

In 2021, political cartoons when successful play a role in the political discourse of a society that provides for freedom of speech and for the press (Thomas Knieper 2007 SOURCE?). Key political cartoonists in the United Kingdom include people such as Peter Brookes who has been a political cartoonist for The Times since 1992 and Nicola Jennings who features regularly in The Guardian.

Street art as political satire  
Street artists like Banksy have used dark political humor and witty political and social commentaries, primarily through graffiti, to comment on various themes such as capitalism, imperialism and war.  Banksy's pieces which feature street art on political satire include "Stop and Search" which illustrates Dorthy, from The Wizard of Oz, being searched by a police officer. Banksy mocks politicians opinions on police brutality as innocent Dorthy is being questioned by the police which is a representation of police brutality.  "Bomb Hugger" is another one of Banksy's pieces which displays a young woman hugging a bomb which was dropped by military planes. He criticizes the nature of war and the opinions of politicians on the subject as the woman represents innocence being directly impacted by the "dark" bomb symbol.

United States
Satire became more visible on American television during the 1960s. Some of the early shows that used political satire include the British and American versions of the program That Was the Week That Was (airing on the American Broadcasting Company, or ABC, in the U.S.), CBS's The Smothers Brothers Comedy Hour, and NBC's Rowan and Martin's Laugh-In. During the months leading up to the 1968 presidential election, Richard Nixon appeared on Laugh-In and repeated the program's catch-phrase "Sock it to me." Other forms of satire of the 1960s and early 1970s typically used the sitcom format, such as the show All in the Family.

When Saturday Night Live debuted in 1975, the show began to change the way that comedians would depict the president on television. Chevy Chase opened the fourth episode of the show with his impersonation of a bumbling Gerald Ford. Chase did not change his appearance to look like President Ford, and he portrayed the president by repeatedly falling down on the stage. Some of the other famous presidential impersonations on Saturday Night Live include Dan Aykroyd's Richard Nixon and Jimmy Carter caricatures, Dana Carvey as George H. W. Bush, Darrell Hammond and Phil Hartman as Bill Clinton, Will Ferrell as George W. Bush, Jay Pharoah and Fred Armisen as Barack Obama. Hartman was the first in a long string of cast members to impersonate Donald Trump, who was most famously impersonated by Darrell Hammond and Alec Baldwin, and currently James Austin Johnson impersonates him. Johnson also impersonates Joe Biden, who was also impersonated by Jason Sudeikis and Jim Carrey.

During the 2008 presidential campaign, Saturday Night Live gained wide attention because former cast member Tina Fey returned to the show to satirize Republican Vice Presidential candidate Sarah Palin. In addition to Fey's striking physical resemblance to Palin, the impersonation of the vice presidential candidate was also noteworthy because of Fey's humorous use of some of exactly the same words Palin used in media interviews and campaign speeches as a way to perform political satire.

Saturday Night Live also uses political satire throughout its Weekend Update sketch. Weekend Update is a fake news segment on the show that satirizes politics and current events. It has been a part of SNL since the first episode of the show on October 11, 1975.

The Daily Show and The Colbert Report use stylistic formats that are similar to Weekend Update. On The Daily Show, host Jon Stewart used footage from news programs to satirize politics and the news media. Stephen Colbert performed in character on The Colbert Report as a right-wing news pundit. Both hosts' television programs were broadcast on Comedy Central, while The Daily Show continues to run featuring Trevor Noah as a new host. Colbert became the host of The Late Show, succeeding David Letterman. With their shows, Stewart and Colbert helped increase public and academic discussion of the significance of political satire. Real Time with Bill Maher and Full Frontal with Samantha Bee are also examples of political commentary.

During the 2020 presidential campaign, perennial candidate Vermin Supreme was recruited by members of the Libertarian Party to run a serious presidential campaign (Vermin Supreme 2020 presidential campaign) which utilizes his satirical character to promote libertarianism.

The Middle East

As early as the Ottoman Empire, political satire was used to express political dissent and mobilize public opinion through shadow puppet shows, improvised folk theater and cartoons. The Ottoman Empire's first satirical magazine was called Karagöz, which translates to "Black eye."

20th and 21st Century 

Turkey is home to the political satire magazine known as LeMan, which published its 1000th issue in 2010. LeMan is known for its political cartoons highlighting corruption, lampooning and shedding light on serious situations using humor.

One of the most-widely read satirists is Egyptian writer Lenin El-Ramly, who is credited with over 30 scripts for films and television series and 12 plays. Another notable Egyptian satirist is Bassem Youssef.

In Syria, in the year 2001 a satirical newspaper known as the Lamplighter was first published and resonated with the public as it sold out immediately. It was the first independent paper in the country since 1965 and was created by cartoonist and satirist Ali Farzat.

Censorship 

A 2002 example of censorship resulted in satirist Ali Farzat having to remove two articles and a cartoon about the Prime Minister from a magazine, which was deemed insulting. Farzat's newspaper was subsequently shut down and his printing license was revoked.

Influence in politics

Contributions 
According to the findings of the 2004 Pew Survey, both younger and older audiences are turning to late-night comedy shows as not only a source of entertainment, but also for an opportunity to gain political awareness. For this reason, Geoffrey Baym suggests that shows that make use of political satire, such as The Daily Show, should be considered as a form of alternative journalism. Utilizing satire has shown to be an attractive feature in news programming, drawing in the audiences of less politically engaged demographic cohorts. Moreover, satire news programming can be considered alternative because satire plays an important role in dissecting and critiquing power.

In his article The Daily Show: Discursive Integration and the Reinvention of Political Journalism, Baym detailed how The Daily Show, then hosted by Jon Stewart, presented news stories. For the satire news show, presenting information in a comprehensive manner was used to give viewers a greater perspective of a situation. Often, Stewart studded his segments with additional background information, or reminders of relevant and past details. For example, The Daily Show displayed the full video of Bush's comments regarding Tenet's resignation in 2004. This was a deliberate choice by the show in attempt to give a more sincere representation of the event. Moreover, it can be seen as a challenge and critique of what more traditional news shows failed to include. In this way, satire news can be seen as more informative than other news sources. Notably, research findings released by National Annenberg Election Survey (NAES) concede that followers of satire news are more knowledgeable and consume more news than the general population.

Meanwhile, Joseph Faina has considered the satire used in news shows as a facilitator in developing a public journalism practice. Faina explains in his article that the nature of satire encourages viewers to become politically engaged, and a civic participant, in which the humor exercised by hosts elicit responses in viewers. However, Faina has acknowledged that this model is somewhat idealistic. Nevertheless, Faina argues that the potential still exists. Not to mention, with the rise in technology and the growing ubiquity of cellular phones, it can be argued that civic participation is all the more easy to accomplish.

Effects on political participation  
Modern studies of the effects of political satire have shown that political satire has an influence on political participation, in fact research has shown that an exposure to satire of a political nature evokes negative emotions which consequently mobilises political participation. It is documented that watching late-night comedy shows increases political participation due to the interpersonal discussions and online interaction that follows as a result of political satire.

On the other hand, some scholars have expressed concern over the influence of political comedy shows, it is argued that rather than increase political participation it has the adverse effect. Rather than mobilise participation it can actually demobilise participation due to the negative analysis of political figures, leading to cynicism towards the government and electoral system.

Concerns 
Though satire in news is celebrated as a vehicle toward a more informed public, such view is not universally shared among scholars. Critics have expressed their hesitancy toward the infiltration of lighthearted practices to cover more dire topics like political affair. Potentially off-color remarks, or vulgar comments made by the likes of Stephen Colbert of The Late Show with Stephen Colbert, or Samantha Bee, host of Full Frontal with Samantha Bee, can be used as examples of what critics are concerned about. Here, satire is believed to diminish the gravity of a topic.

Baym proposes that as these shows are alternative, they have no obligation to "abide by standard practices". Unlike traditional news sources, which may be required to adhere to certain agendas, like political affiliation or advertising restrictions, hosts of satire news shows are free and zealous to showcase personal contributions through their mentions of disdain, qualms, and excitement. Critics of satire in news shows thus believe that the showcasing of an overly and openly frustrated host will induce or perpetuate "cynicism in viewers".

The Financial Times argues that political satire can contribute to "media led populism", this is argued to be due to the mockery of politicians and public officials that is required to be accountable only to "audience maximisation", it is argued that this form of media led populism is more prevalent in the United States than the United Kingdom, as commentators who are both Liberal and Conservative are being used more often as the "main way" in which young viewers learn about current affairs. This is particularly troublesome when commentators use polemic and sarcasm in their satire as opposed to witty humour or impersonations.

See also

Augustan literature
Kabarett
News satire
List of frivolous political parties
Post turtle
Social commentary

References

External links
The Great Fatted Bull, the bull who would be king. The world's first political satire.
 The Princess Wife. The world's second political satire.

 
Satire
The arts and politics
 Satire